North Ossetian State University after K.L. Khetagurov (NOSU, СОГУ) is a university in Vladikavkaz, Russia. It was founded in 1920 and was named after Kosta Levanovich Khetagurov. Founded in 1920, the university is directed at education, cooperation, and innovation in different academic areas of the humanities, technical and natural sciences, arts and sports.

Faculties 
At present, the university consists of 22 Faculties offering pre-university training and postgraduate studies. The University administrates Scientific and Research Institute for Sustainable Development of Mountain Territories, Republic of North Ossetia Alania Institute of History and Archaeology, Institute of Ossetian Language History and Development. There are such training directions as:

 International 
 RelationsJournalism

 Economics and Management
 Mathematics and Computer Science
 Geography and Geo-Ecology
 Medicine
 Russian Philology
 Chemistry, Biology and Biotechnology
 Physics and Technology
 Law
 Ossetian Literature and Language
 Arts
 Educational Psychology
 Sport and Recreation
 History

International cooperation 
International cooperation has always been one of NOSU development priorities. Since 2000 the university has initiated and participated in joint research and academic projects with the European Commission, the UN, International Research Institute of Stanford University. In recent years more than 500 students and faculty participated in international conferences, workshops, and scientific exchange programs (USAID, IREX, DAAD, Fulbright, Tempus,
Copernicus, etc.). But he closest scienstific relationships the University has with Allameh Tabataba’i University. The point is the Ossetian and Farsi languages are tied closely so these universities have good ground for cooperation. So in 2014 the NOSU Center for Iranian Culture was opened with the support of Mekhdi Sanan, the ambassador of the Islamic Republic of Iran in Moscow.

Campus 
NOSU has two academic buildings in different parts of the city and two dormitories that can accommodate about 300 students. According to rector of the university, Alan Ogoev, the university plans to build a new 500-seat dormitory to have more places for foreign students. At present time there are students from 14 countries, including China, Senegal, Cameroon, Syria.

References

External links
 North Ossetian State University 

 
Universities in Russia
Vladikavkaz
1920 establishments in Russia
Educational institutions established in 1920
Buildings and structures in North Ossetia–Alania
Cultural heritage monuments in North Ossetia–Alania